The 2022–23 Manhattan Jaspers basketball team represented Manhattan College in the 2022–23 NCAA Division I men's basketball season. The Jaspers, led by interim head coach RaShawn Stores, played their home games at Draddy Gymnasium in Riverdale, New York as members of the Metro Atlantic Athletic Conference.

Previous season
The Jaspers finished the 2021–22 season 15–15, 8–12 in MAAC play to finish tied for seventh place. As the 8 seed, they were defeated by 9 seed Rider in the first round of the MAAC Tournament.

On October 25, 2022, just two weeks prior to the start of the season, Manhattan announced that head coach Steve Masiello would be leaving the program after 11 years at the helm. Assistant head coach RaShawn Stores, who has spent the last six years as an assistant, was named interim head coach for the upcoming season.

Roster

Schedule and results

|-
!colspan=12 style=| Regular season

|-
!colspan=12 style=| MAAC tournament

Sources

References

Manhattan Jaspers basketball seasons
Manhattan Jaspers
Manhattan Jaspers basketball
Manhattan Jaspers basketball